Centre de Recherche et d'Études pour l'Alimentation (The Culinary Research and Education Academy or CREA) is a culinary academy and food science think tank that provides training and consultation services for food industry professionals in the sous-vide cooking method, as well as other food-forward techniques. CREA was established in Paris in 1991 by Bruno Goussault and is the service arm of its parent company, Cuisine Solutions.

History 
Credited with developing modern sous-vide, Bruno Goussault’s work with low-temperature, under-vacuum cooking dates back to the 1970s, during which he conducted a study that demonstrated how cooking beef shoulder sous-vide extended its shelf life to 60 days. 

Following a partnership with three-star chef Joël Robuchon in the 1980s to create a menu featuring sous-vide prepared foods for the Société nationale des chemins de fer français (SNCF, "National society of French railways" or "French National Railway Corporation"), France's national train system, Goussault received encouragement from Robuchon to open a sous-vide training center. 

CREA opened its doors in Paris in 1991 to teach students the proper techniques and safety precautions necessary for sous-vide cooking. Since then, Goussault and his team of food engineers and culinary professionals have helped to train over 80% of chefs with three Michelin Guide stars, including Thomas Keller, Yannick Alléno, Anne-Sophie Pic, Guy Savoy, and Michel Bras.

Courses & offerings 
In addition to holding sous-vide courses at its Paris location, CREA has expanded to offer training sessions at its Test Kitchen in Sterling, Virginia, global seminars, and on-site customized instruction at food organizations around the world. 

CREA also offers online courses on culinary techniques such as the sous-vide method, mixology, butchery, food safety, and food quality. Aside from its training classes, CREA provides full-service consultation to various stakeholders in the food industry, including menu engineering, quality assurance, food safety, food quality, kitchen design, facility development, labor reduction, operational excellence, and equipment procurement.

References

Cooking schools